Annual Review of Chemical and Biomolecular Engineering is an annual peer-reviewed scientific journal published by Annual Reviews, covering chemical and biomolecular engineering. The co-editors are Michael F. Doherty and Rachel A. Segalman. As of 2022, Journal Citation Reports, gives the journal an impact factor of 9.700.

History
The Annual Review of Chemical and Biomolecular Engineering was first published in 2010 by nonprofit publisher Annual Reviews. Its founding editor was John Prausnitz. In 2018, Prausnitz was succeeded by Michael F. Doherty and Rachel A. Segalman as co-editors. Though it was initially published in print, as of 2021 it is only published electronically.

Scope and indexing
The Annual Review of Chemical and Biomolecular Engineering defines its scope as covering significant developments relevant to chemical engineering. It includes disciplines such as applied chemistry and biology, physics, and engineering with a focus on the development of chemical products and processes. As of 2022, Journal Citation Reports lists the journal's impact factor as 9.700, ranking it fifth of 72 journal titles in the category "Chemistry, Applied" and twelfth of 142 titles in "Engineering, Chemical". It is abstracted and indexed in Scopus, Science Citation Index Expanded, CAB Abstracts, EMBASE, and MEDLINE, among others.

Editorial processes
The Annual Review of Chemical and Biomolecular Engineering is helmed by the editor or the co-editors. The editor is assisted by the editorial committee, which includes associate editors, regular members, and occasionally guest editors. Guest members participate at the invitation of the editor, and serve terms of one year. All other members of the editorial committee are appointed by the Annual Reviews board of directors and serve five-year terms. The editorial committee determines which topics should be included in each volume and solicits reviews from qualified authors. Unsolicited manuscripts are not accepted. Peer review of accepted manuscripts is undertaken by the editorial committee.

Current editorial board
As of 2022,  the editorial committee consists of the two co-editors and the following members:

 Ravi S. Kane
 Linda J. Broadbelt
 Kookheon Char
 Wilfred Chen
 Lydia Contreras
 Christopher W. Jones
 Sanat K. Kumar
 Joseph B. Powell
 Irina Smirnova
 Levi T. Thompson

See also
 List of engineering journals and magazines

References 

 

Chemical and Biomolecular Engineering
Annual journals
Publications established in 2010
Chemical engineering journals
Biochemistry journals
English-language journals